

O
 OACX - Central Transportation, Inc.
 OAR  - Old Augusta Railroad
 OCCU - ATS Container Leasing SA
 OCCX - Occidental Chemical Company
 OCE  - Oregon, California and Eastern Railway
 OCEU - Oceanex Inc.
 OCFX - Owens Corning Fiberglass
 OCLU - Overseas Containers, Ltd.
 OCNU - Ocean Lines, Inc.
 OCPX - Occidental Chemical Company; Oxy Vinyls
 OCR  - Oklahoma Central Railroad
 OCRR - Ottawa Central Railway
 OCRX - Oil Creek Refining Company
 OCSU - Scripps Institute of Oceanography
 OCTL - Oil Creek and Titusville Lines
 OCTR - Octoraro Railway
 OCTX - Octel America, Inc.
 ODTX - Oil-Dri Corporation of America
 OEDX - Ohio Edison Company
OERX - Southern California Railway Museum
 OFCX - Ortner Freight Car Company
 OFOX - Residco
 OFSX - Tucson Electric Power Company
 OGEE - Ogeechee Railway
 OGEX - Oklahoma Gas and Electric Company
 OGSX - Iowa Southern Utilities Company
 OHCR - Ohio Central Railroad
 OHFX - Fluor Daniel Fernald
 OHIC - Ohi-Rail Corporation
 OHIO - Ohio Terminal Railway
 OHKU - Ohka American, Inc.
 OHOX - United States Department of Energy (Ohio Field)
 OHPA - Ohio and Pennsylvania Railroad
 OHRY - Owego and Harford Railway
 OILX - GE Rail Services
 OJGX - Oscar J. Glover
 OJTX - Tauber Transportation Company
 OKAN - Okanagan Valley Railway (OmniTRAX)
 OKCE - Okarche Central Railway
 OKCX - Lone Star Industries
 OKKT - Oklahoma, Kansas and Texas Railroad; Union Pacific Railroad
 OLAU - Occidental Chemical Corporation
 OLB  - Omaha, Lincoln and Beatrice Railway
 OLDX - Old Line Holding Company, Inc.
 OLLU - Ocean Leasing, Ltd.
 OLNX - Olin Corporation
 OLO  - Ontario L'Orignal Railway
 OLYR - Olympic Railroad
 OLYU - Olympic Container Corporation
 OLYR - Olympic Railroad
 OLYX - Olympia Petroleum, Inc.
 OLYZ - Showa Line, Ltd.
 OMAX - Omaha Public Power District
 OMID - Ontario Midland Railroad
 OMLP - Ohio Midland Light and Power
 OMLX - OmniTRAX Leasing, Ltd.
 OMNX - Omnisource;  Steel Dynamics.
 OMRX - Ozark Mountain Railcar
 OMSX - Ohio Mulch; J. T. Leasing, Inc.
 ONCT - Ontario Central Railroad
 ONER - Ontario Eastern Railroad
 ONSX - Oglebay Norton Industrial Sands, Inc.
 ONT  - Ontario Northland Railway
 ONTA - Ontario Northland Railway
 ONTX - On-Track Railcar Services, Inc.
 ONW  - Oregon and Northwestern Railroad
 ONYX - American Colloid Company
 OOCZ - Orient Overseas Line, Inc.
 OOLU - OOCL
 OOOX - Osborne, Inc.
 OOUU - Orient Overseas Line, Inc.
 OPE  - Oregon, Pacific and Eastern Railway
 OPIX - Equistar Chemicals
 OPPX - Omaha Public Power District
 OPR  - Oregon Pacific Railroad
 OPSU - EMP
 OPSX - Public Service Company of Oklahoma
 OPT  - Orange Port Terminal Railway
 OPX  - Ohio Power Company
 OR   - Owasco River Railway
 ORA  - Ormet Railroad
 ORCU - BSL Transport
 OREX - Oregon Department of Agriculture
 OROX - United States Department of Energy (Oak Ridge Operations Office)
 ORR  - Osage Railroad
 OSCZ - Intermodal Services, Inc.
 OSL  - Oregon Short Line; Union Pacific Railroad
 OSRX - Ontario Southland Railway
 OSSU - Eurovos B.V.
 OTCO - Owensville Terminal Company
 OTCR - Oakdale Traction Corporation
 OTDX - Greenbrier Leasing Corporation
 OTPX - Otter Tail Power Company
 OTR  - Oakland Terminal Railway
 OTRX - On-Track Railway Services, Ltd.
 OTSX - On-Track Railway Services, Ltd.
 OTT  - Ottumwa Terminal Railroad
 OTTX - TTX Corporation
 OTVR - Otter Tail Valley Railroad (RailAmerica)
 OUCH - Ouachita Railroad
 OUCX - Orlando Utilities Commission
 OURD - Ogden Union Railway and Depot Company
 OVEX - Ohio Valley Electric Company
 OVNZ - Overnite Transportation Company
 OVO  - Ottawa Valley Railway
 OVR  - Ohio Valley Railroad
 OWIX - Old World Transportation, Ltd.
 OWLU - Ocean World Lines, Inc.
 OWSX - Oil Well Supply Company
 OWTX - Shamrock Coal Company
 OXYU - Eurotainer US, Inc.

O